Gary Charles Wallace (born 8 February 1958) is a Zimbabwean first-class cricketer who played for Rhodesia cricket team from 1978 to 1980 then for Zimbabwe cricket team from 1980 to 1986 including in 1982 ICC Trophy and 1986 ICC Trophy.

References

External links
 

1959 births
Living people
Zimbabwean cricketers
Sportspeople from Harare
Rhodesia cricketers